Sarab-e Harasam (also Romanized as Sarāb-e Harasam and Sarāb-e Harasm) is a village in Harasam Rural District, Homeyl District, Eslamabad-e Gharb County, Kermanshah Province, Iran. At the 2006 census, its population was 522, in 126 families.

References 

Populated places in Eslamabad-e Gharb County